Sherri Browning Erwin (born October 8, 1968) is an American novelist, best known for literary mash-ups, paranormal romance, and historical romance.

Biography 

Sherri Browning Erwin was born on October 8, 1968, in Holyoke, Massachusetts. She graduated from Mount Holyoke College in 1990 with a B.A. in English literature. In 1999, her first book, The Scoundrel's Vow, was published by Dell Books. She currently lives in Connecticut with her husband and two children.

In 2010, she released Jane Slayre, a mash-up parody of Charlotte Brontë's Jane Eyre which added vampires, werewolves, and other such supernatural elements to the original story. The book was released during the literary mash-up trend started by Seth Grahame-Smith's hit Pride and Prejudice and Zombies, and was cited by reviewers as a positive example of the trend. Jane Slayre was generally well-received, and received a follow-up, Grave Expectations, a year later.

In 2014, she began the Thornbrook Park series, a historical romance trilogy set in the post-Edwardian era. The final novel in the series, The Great Estate, was released in July 2015.

Published works

Novels 

The Scoundrel's Vow	(1999/Aug) (Dell) 
Once Wicked	(2000/July) (Dell) 
To Hell with Love	(2007/Apr) (Kensington)
Naughty or Nice	(2008/Oct) (Kensington)
Jane Slayre	(2010/Apr) (Gallery)
Grave Expectations	(2011/Aug) (Gallery)
Thornbrook Park	(2014/June) (Sourcebooks)
An Affair Downstairs	(2015/Jan) (Sourcebooks)
The Great Estate	(2015/July) (Sourcebooks)

Anthology work 

"Fade to Black" - part of The Mammoth Book of Vampire Romance	(2009/June) (Running Press)
"Mr. Sandman" - part of The Mammoth Book of Paranormal Romance 2	(2009/June) (Running Press)
Foreword, FEAR: A Modern Anthology of Horror and Terror Volume 2	(2012/Sep)

E-books 

Once Wicked	(2014/March) (Self-published rerelease)
The Scoundrel's Vow	(2014/May) (Self-published rerelease)

External links 

http://www.sherribrowningerwin.com
http://www.goodreads.com/author/show/288167.Sherri_Browning_Erwin

References 

1968 births
21st-century American novelists
American women novelists
Living people
21st-century American women writers
Writers from Holyoke, Massachusetts
Mount Holyoke College alumni